Steve Dodd (1 June 1928 – 10 November 2014) was an Indigenous Australian actor, notable for playing indigenous characters across seven decades of Australian film. After beginning his working life as a stockman and rodeo rider, Dodd was given his first film roles by prominent Australian actor Chips Rafferty. His career was interrupted by six years in the Australian Army during the Korean War, and limited by typecasting.

Dodd performed in several major Australian movies, including Gallipoli and The Chant of Jimmie Blacksmith, in which he played Tabidgi, the murdering uncle of the lead character. He also held minor parts in Australia-based international film productions including The Coca-Cola Kid, Quigley Down Under and The Matrix. He likewise appeared in minor roles in early Australian television series, such as Homicide and Rush, as well as later series including The Flying Doctors. In 2013, Dodd was honoured with the Jimmy Little Lifetime Achievement Award at the 19th Deadly Awards at the Sydney Opera House. He died in November 2014.

Life and career outside acting
Dodd, also known as Mullawa or Mulla walla (flying fish), was an Arunta or Arrente Indigenous man from central Australia. It is unclear if Dodd was from the Northern Territory or South Australia: one source states he was born in Alice Springs, and another states he was born at the Hermannsburg Mission, to the town's south-west. However a third source suggests Oodnadatta, across the border in South Australia, while Dodd himself, in a 2011 interview, stated he was South Australian. A 1953 newspaper report states that he was from Coober Pedy and had been resident at Colebrook Home, which housed Indigenous children from northern South Australia; some residents subsequently identified as members of the Stolen Generation. The only record of a birth date is in the Department of Veterans' Affairs' Nominal Roll of Australian Veterans of the Korean War, which gives 1 June 1928.

In 1966 he was reported to be a bachelor; later sources shed no light on his marital status. In 1971 he remarked in an interview that his father and six brothers were living in the Northern Territory.

In the 19th and 20th centuries, Indigenous Australian men played significant roles as stockmen in the Australian pastoral industry, and as entertainers participating in competitive demonstrations of stockmen's skills, referred to as rough riding. Dodd worked as a stockman, horse breaker and rodeo rider prior to and during his acting career, including a period working for rider and entertainer Smoky Dawson. He was a member of the Rough Riders Association, and gave exhibition rides at the Calgary Stampede in 1964.

Dodd served in Korea, during a six-year stint in the Australian Army, with the 1st Battalion, Royal Australian Regiment; his service number was 41018. Interviewed in May 2011 he indicated that he "was the first Aboriginal to sign up from South Australia to go to Korea". A photograph of him in uniform in Korea is amongst images on permanent display at the Australian War Memorial. From 1969 to at least 1973 Dodd worked as a guide for Airlines of New South Wales, escorting tours to Uluru and other locations in central Australia. Dodd has stated that he demonstrated boomerang and spear-throwing at Expo 70, and at an Olympic Games (though which year is unknown). He was also a participant in a re-enactment of Captain James Cook's landing in Australia, as part of the Australian Bicentenary celebrations.

In 1985, Dodd was living in Manly, New South Wales, having spent fifteen years in Sydney's northern suburbs. For the last two decades of his life, Dodd lived at St Georges Basin on the south coast of New South Wales, where he died on 10 November 2014, aged 86.

Acting career

Early career
Dodd's first opportunity to act in Australian film came in 1946, when actor Chips Rafferty noticed Dodd on the set of The Overlanders and gave him a small role. It was the first of three Rafferty movies in which Dodd secured a part, the second being Bitter Springs in 1950. This film was notable for being "a serious study of the relations of white settlers and Aborigines" and "more honest than most Australian film-makers ventured to be at that time".

Film writer Bruce Molloy described the film as a "lucid and dramatically effective representation" of black–white conflict in colonial Australia, giving Indigenous Australians "a degree of justice long denied them in cinematic representation".

Dodd was working on Bitter Springs as a tracker and interpreter for actor Michael Pate when Rafferty arranged for him to have an on-screen role. There was a positive relationship between the Indigenous Arrente people and the cast and crew, particularly Rafferty, involved in the location filming for Bitter Springs in the area of Quorn in northern South Australia. Michael Pate said that Rafferty "wasn't a prejudiced person ... Chips was a person who appreciated the Aborigine [sic] very much ... he got on very well with the people". Dodd, meanwhile, appreciated Rafferty's vision for an Australian film industry and its potential to provide opportunities for Indigenous Australians.

Rafferty was the star of the film that gave Dodd his third minor screen role, Kangaroo (1952).

In 1957, the J Arthur Rank Organisation, an English company, came to Australia to make a film adaptation of Robbery Under Arms, an Australian colonial novel by Rolf Boldrewood. Dodd travelled to Britain and the United States with the company for six months; in what role is unknown. He said he worked with Rafferty on a fourth film, Wake in Fright, in 1971, but Dodd's name does not appear in published cast lists. In the same year, he was cast in the role of an Aboriginal caretaker for a film he said was called Sacrifice.

On stage, Dodd performed the role of Darky Morris in a 1966 J.C. Williamson stage production of Desire of the Moth, with a season of nearly three months in Melbourne and Sydney. In 1971, he appeared in an early Sydney production of Kevin Gilbert's seminal work, The Cherry Pickers.

There were numerous small television roles for Dodd. His work for Smoky Dawson included appearing in a television production, Adventure with Smoky Dawson: Tim Goes Walkabout, broadcast in June 1966. In other television work, Dodd participated in a Channel 7 documentary series about pioneering Australian transport company Cobb and Co, and also worked on several documentary programs for the Australian Broadcasting Corporation. Dodd had minor roles in many early Australian TV dramas of the 1960s and 1970s, including Skippy the Bush Kangaroo, Division 4, Delta (1969), Riptide (1969), Woobinda – Animal Doctor (1970), Spyforce (1972–73), Homicide (1974), and Rush (1976). One of these, Woobinda – Animal Doctor, marked the first appearance of an Indigenous Australian in a television series lead role – not by Dodd, but by a Bindi Williams, playing an adopted son of the show's star. In 1973 it was reported that a television film Marra Marra featuring prominent Aboriginal actors David Gumpilil and Bob Maza, together with Dodd and Zac Martin, had been completed.

Although Dodd obtained small parts in several television series, for many years he and his fellow Aboriginal actors found themselves included in only minor and typecast roles in television productions. According to Indigenous actor, historian and activist Gary Foley, Dodd joked that "he was sick of roles where his total dialogue was, 'he went that way, Boss!'" Reflecting on this issue, a commentator remarked on the 1978 film Little Boy Lost: "There are many irrelevant scenes, the most obvious one being where Tracker Bindi (Steve Dodd), an Aboriginal, is introduced – yet another tired reinforcement of a false stereotype."

Later career
Dodd contributed to several films in which issues facing Indigenous Australians, such as land rights and race relations, were the central subjects. These appearances included Bitter Springs (mentioned above) and The Chant of Jimmie Blacksmith (1978), the first of two films in which he appeared alongside Jack Thompson. Dodd played the character of Tabidgi, the uncle of the lead character, Aboriginal man Jimmie Blacksmith. In the film, Jimmie Blacksmith marries a white woman named Gilda Marshall (played by Angela Punch McGregor). When they have a baby, Dodd's character, "a tribal elder, ... is worried about Jimmie's marriage to a white woman and has brought him a talisman to keep him safe". Pauline Kael, writing in The New Yorker, described the performances of the two black professional actors (Jack Charles and Dodd) as "wonderful as sots: ... Steve Dodds [sic], who is tried for murder and simply says, 'You'd think it would take a good while to make up your mind to kill someone and then to kill them, but take my word for it, it only takes a second'".

Dodd's career was busiest in the 1980s, and by 1985 it was reported that he had acted in 55 movies or television features. In 1981 he played Billy Snakeskin in the film Gallipoli, about the fate of young men who participated in the World War I Gallipoli Campaign of 1915. This was followed by parts in Chase Through the Night and Essington, both in 1984. In 1985 he played the role of Mr Joe in The Coca-Cola Kid, an Australian romantic comedy with an international cast including Eric Roberts and Greta Scacchi. In 1986 he appeared in the film Short Changed, while through the mid-1980s he had minor parts in the popular television series The Flying Doctors (1985–1988).

The Chant of Jimmie Blacksmith was not the only film in which Dodd appeared that addressed topical Indigenous issues of the day. A decade after Jimmie Blacksmith, Dodd performed in Ground Zero, again with Jack Thompson in one of the lead roles. This film is a thriller based on claims that Indigenous Australians were used as human guinea pigs in the British nuclear tests at Maralinga. The film uses as its context the McClelland Royal Commission, which was investigating radioactive contamination at the site. In the film, Dodd plays a minor character named Freddy Tjapaljarri.

Sources differ on whether Dodd had a part in Evil Angels (released as A Cry in the Dark outside of Australia and New Zealand), the 1988 film about the Azaria Chamberlain disappearance, with Dodd's name not included in the cast list published by Australian Film 1978–1994, but appearing in the longer cast listing provided by IMDb. In 1988 he played a minor role in Kadaicha, an unreleased horror film about a series of unexplained murders. In 1990 Dodd appeared in two films: Quigley Down Under, a western made in Australia but starring American Tom Selleck and Briton Alan Rickman; and The Crossing, an Australian drama set in a country town.

Dodd's career returned to politically contentious Indigenous issues when he played a minor role, of Kummengu, in the 1991 film Deadly. This film is a police drama based around the death of an Indigenous man in police custody. As in Ground Zero, the subject was very topical: the movie was released at the same time as the report of the Royal Commission into Aboriginal Deaths in Custody, which had for four years been examining why so many Indigenous Australians died in police detention.

In 1999, Dodd was one of three actors in Wind, a short film portraying the pursuit of an old Aboriginal man (Dodd) by a young black tracker and a white police sergeant. That same year was marked by the most commercially successful film of his career, The Matrix. Later, Dodd played minor roles in an episode of television series The Alice (2006) and the movies My Country (2007) and Broken Sun (2008); by this time his career in film and television had lasted for over sixty years.

In 2013, Dodd received the Jimmy Little Lifetime Achievement Award at the 19th Deadly Awards at the Sydney Opera House. Departing from tradition by presenting the award to someone who was not primarily a musician, the organisers described Dodd as "an actor that created a pathway for others across the entire arts and music sectors to follow, at a time when typecasting stereotypes and discrimination was the 'norm' in Australia's arts industry".

Filmography

References

Bibliography
 Scott Murray (ed.) Australian Film 1978–1994: A Survey of Theatrical Features (2nd ed'n). Melbourne: Oxford University Press, Australian Film Commission and Cinema Papers; .

External links

 
 Historical image of Steve Dodd in 1966 theatre production, Desire of the Moth
 Contemporary image of Dodd, townsendmt.wordpress.com; accessed 11 November 2014

1928 births
2014 deaths
Australian Army soldiers
Australian military personnel of the Korean War
Indigenous Australian male actors
Indigenous Australian military personnel
Place of birth unknown
20th-century Australian male actors
Australian male film actors
21st-century Australian male actors